Sarika Singh is the name of:
Sarika Devendra Singh Baghel (born 1980), Indian politician
Sarika Singh (Thangka painter), painter and teacher
Sarika Singh, actor in Kaamyaab